Tang-e Chuk (also Romanized as Tang-e Chūk; also known as Tang-e Chūg) is a village in Poshtkuh-e Rostam Rural District, Sorna District, Rostam County, Fars Province, Iran. At the 2006 census, its population was 145, in 31 families.

References 

Populated places in Rostam County